My Brother's Keeper (Long Live G) is the debut extended play by American rapper DaBaby. It was released through Interscope Records and South Coast on November 20, 2020. The EP features guest appearances from Meek Mill, NoCap, Polo G, and Toosii. It consists of seven tracks and was released as a tribute to DaBaby's older brother, Glenn Johnson, who died from suicide, on November 3, 2020.

Background
On November 3, 2020, DaBaby's older brother, Glenn Johnson, died at the age of thirty-four, from committing suicide. He had died from a self-inflicted gunshot wound. He had four kids, one son and three daughters. The following day, the rapper, via social media, reflected and shared lyrics from a few lines of one of his previous tracks, titled "Intro" (2019), which said "My brother be thinkin' that we don't love him and let him struggle like we ain't family / Like I won't give up all I got to see you happy, nigga".

Music videos
The official music video for "Gucci Peacoat" was premiered along with the EP, followed by the video for "More Money More Problems" three days later, on November 23.

Track listing
Credits adapted from ASCAP.

Notes
 "Gucci Peacoat" features a spoken conversation between DaBaby and his late brother Glenn Johnson.

Charts

References

DaBaby albums
2020 debut EPs
Interscope Records EPs